Zia Us-Salam (born 4 February 1990) is a Pakistani footballer, who plays for Khan Research Laboratories as a midfielder. He is the captain of Khan Research Laboratories. He won four league titles and five National Challenge Cup with the club.

He made his international debut on 19 November 2012, against Singapore in a 4–0 loss.

International
Zia made his international debut on 19 November 2012 in a friendly match against Singapore in a 4–0 loss. He made his competitive debut in 2013 SAFF Championship against Nepal in a 1–1 draw, coming on as a 72nd minute substitute for Muhammad Riaz. He played his first full international against Bangladesh in the competition, as Pakistan won the match 1–2. Zia has not made an appearance for national team since.

Career statistics

Club

International

Honours

Club
Khan Research Laboratories
Pakistan Premier League: 2011–12, 2012–13, 2013–14, 2018–19
National Football Challenge Cup: 2010, 2011, 2012 ,2015 , 2016

References

1990 births
Living people
Pakistani footballers
Pakistan international footballers
Association football midfielders
Khan Research Laboratories F.C. players